Lucie Hradecká and Andreja Klepač were the defending champions, but lost in the semifinals to Květa Peschke and Demi Schuurs.

Peschke and Schuurs went on to win the title, defeating Nicole Melichar and Xu Yifan in the final, 6–1, 4–6, [10–4].

Seeds

Draw

Finals

Top half

Bottom half

External links
Main draw

Western & Southern Open Doubles
Women's Doubles